Samantha Mae Adaliga Bernardo (born November 10, 1992) is a Filipino television personality and beauty pageant titleholder who was appointed as Binibining Pilipinas Grand International 2020. She represented the Philippines at the Miss Grand International 2020 pageant in Bangkok, Thailand and placed 1st Runner-Up.

Personal life 
Bernardo was born in Puerto Princesa, Palawan after from San Juan, Metro Manila when she was eight; she carried the banner of her hometown twice in the Binibining Pilipinas pageant in 2018 and 2019. She was a gymnast and competed in MIMAROPA Regional Athletics Meet where she won 5 gold medals and was hailed as the competition's overall champion. She represented Palawan in national meets. She is a graduate of International Hospitality Management at the Palawan State University. She is also a licensed Financial Advisor. She is also the spokesperson of the Philippine Movement Against Malaria and joined David Beckham on the campaign.

Health 
On January 9, 2022, just days after her eviction from the Pinoy Big Brother house, Bernardo contracted COVID-19. She tested negative on January 18, 2022.

Career

Inside pageantry

National Pageants 
Miss World Philippines 2013
At the age of 20, Bernardo competed at the Miss World Philippines 2013 pageant and placed in the Top 13. The eventual winner was Megan Young, who was later crowned as Miss World 2013. In this pageant, she won the Best in Talent award.

Binibining Pilipinas 2018
Samantha joined the Binibining Pilipinas 2018 pageant and finished as 2nd runner-up. She also bagged the Reader's Choice award.

Binibining Pilipinas 2019
Samantha joined the Binibining Pilipinas 2019 pageant, her second time to do so. At the end of the pageant, she was announced as the 2nd runner-up and received the Miss Blackwater special award. Due to the resignation of Miss Grand Philippines 2019 Samantha Ashley Lo, Bernardo was promoted to the 1st runner-up placement as Aya Abesamis assumed the vacated title.

Binibining Pilipinas 2020
Bernardo tried her luck for the third time at the Binibining Pilipinas 2020 but due to the  COVID-19 pandemic, the pageant was postponed. She won the Miss Ever Bilena award before the postponement was announced. The Binibining Pilipinas Organization selected her to represent the Philippines at Miss Grand International 2020 in Bangkok, Thailand instead of the current titleholder, Aya Abesamis, who was said to be past the age requirement for the pageant.

International pageants 
Miss Grand International 2020
Bernardo represented the Philippines at Miss Grand International 2020 held in Bangkok on March 27, 2020 where she placed 1st Runner-Up. 

During the Top 10 speech her message was:

In the Top 5 question and answer portion, they were asked with the following question: "With the current COVID-19 situation, what would you choose between: shutting down the country for the safety of the people knowing that the country and its economy will be deeply affected, or would you open up the country to keep the economy running taking the risk of COVID-19 infections and the consequences?" She replied:

Because of the even scores of the candidates, Miss Grand International president, Nawat Itsaragrisil decided to ask one more question. The final question was: "There’s only one dose of COVID-19 vaccine left. And you have to choose who to give it to either between a 15-year-old or a senior citizen of 70 years old. Who would you choose to give it to and why?”" Her response was:

57th Binibining Pilipinas
Prior to the 57th Binibining Pilipinas in 2021, Bernardo collaborated with 2016 Miss Grand International runner-up and pageant co-host Nicole Cordoves for a photo shoot. She opened the pageant preliminaries, and crowned her successor, Samantha Panlilio, as Binibining Pilipinas Grand International 2021.

Binibining Pilipinas 2022
Bernardo, Catriona Gray, Nicole Cordoves and Edward Barber co-hosted Binibining Pilipinas 2022.

Outside pageantry 
In October 2021, Bernardo was announced as an official housemate in the Celebrity Edition of Pinoy Big Brother: Kumunity Season 10. In January 01, 2022, Bernardo failed to clinch the last spot in Top 2, finishing in the 3rd position to conclude the Celebrity Edition. However, with one of the Celebrity Kumunity Top 2 withdrawing from the competition due to prior commitments, Bernardo replaced volleyball player and fellow housemate Alyssa Valdez and became the Top 2 finalist. At the big night on May 29, 2022 (where she was one of the Big 5), she was named as third placer, winning the 300,000 peso prize. Singer and actress Anji Salvacion was named the season's Ultimate Big Winner, winning the 2,000,000 peso grand prize.

She is currently one of the hosts of PIE Channel, the Philippines' first multiscreen and real-time interactive entertainment channel.

Notes

References

External links 

1992 births
Living people
Binibining Pilipinas winners
People from Palawan
People from San Juan, Metro Manila
Miss Grand International contestants
Miss World Philippines contestants
Filipino female models
Pinoy Big Brother contestants